Ramwod or Ramwold (c. 900 in Trier (?) - 17 May 1000 in Regensburg) was an abbot of St. Emmeram's Abbey in Regensburg. He is a patron figure of eye disease sufferers, since he suddenly became blind, remained so for two years, then regained his sight - he has been beatified and his feast day is 17 June.

Life
Ramwod was originally a Benedictine in St. Maximin's Abbey in Trier, but in 975 he was summoned to Regensburg by Wolfgang of Regensburg. He was the first 'autonomous abbot' of St. Emmeram's Abbey and under his leadership that abbey became an intellectual and religious centre of its time, experiencing a particular heyday in the field of book illumination.

Bibliography 
  
  Heiligenlexikon.de: Ramwod

900s births
1000 deaths
Year of birth uncertain
German beatified people
German abbots
People from Trier